Huang Jiguang (January 18, 1931 – October 19, 1952) was a highly-decorated Chinese soldier, considered a war hero for sacrificing himself to block an enemy machine gun emplacement with his body during the Korean War.

Early life 
Huang was born in Sichuan Province in 1931. His mother was Deng Fangzhi and brother was Huang Jishu. In March 1951, Huang decided to join the People's Volunteer Army to in the Korean War.

After joining the war, Huang became a runner and was later awarded the Meritorious Service, Third Class for his bravery.

Death 
At the Battle of Triangle Hill in October 1952, Huang's unit was tasked with destroying an enemy blockhouse. According to official accounts, Huang hurled himself against a machine gun slit on the blockhouse after running out of ammunition. Though he was promptly killed by the gun, his body managed to block enemy fire, allowing Chinese forces to advance and overrun the position.

In one version of the story, it was also claimed that Huang's final action was specifically inspired by the Soviet war film Private Aleksandr Matrosov, which was in turn based on the real-life exploits of Alexander Matrosov during World War II.

Awards 

Huang was posthumously given the title of "Combat Hero, Second Class", which was later upgraded to "Combat Hero, Special Class". The North Korean government also awarded Huang with the title of "Hero of the Democratic People's Republic of Korea", a Gold Star Medal and the Order of the National Flag (First-Class).

Legacy 
A company of People's Liberation Army Air Force Airborne Corps is named after Huang Jiguang.

See also
Hunan Avetisyan
Dong Cunrui
Qiu Shaoyun

References 

1931 births
1952 deaths
People from Deyang
Chinese military personnel killed in the Korean War